The following list of chief rabbis of Iran gives information regarding the Chief Rabbi of the mainstream majority Orthodox Persian Jewish community of Iran. The Chief Rabbi is also the worldwide spiritual leader of Persian Jewry.

List

See also
 Chief Rabbi
 Persian Jews
 History of the Jews in Iran

References

 
Chief Rabbis
Chief Rabbis of Iran
Chief Rabbis of Iran
Chief Rabbis of Iran
Chief Rabbis of Iran
Chief Rabbis of Iran
Chief Rabbis of Iran